Jacksoul, sometimes stylized as jackSOUL, was a Canadian soul and R&B music group formed in 1995 in Toronto. The band was fronted by singer Haydain Neale and was a multi-recipient of the Juno Award.

Biography
In 1996, Jacksoul released their debut album, Absolute. The album featured the singles "(Do You) Like It Like That", "Eastbound" and "Unconditional".

The band became best known for their hits "Can't Stop", "Still Believe in Love", and "Somedays".

Each of the band's albums were nominated for a Juno Award, and the group won the award for R&B/Soul Recording of the Year in 2001, 2007 and 2010. The band won a Canadian Urban Music Award in 2004.

Neale was involved in a traffic accident on the evening of August 3, 2007, and was sent to hospital. On August 18, 2007, it was reported that Neale had been in a coma since the accident occurred.

On October 1, 2007, jacksoul's official site announced that Neale had been making a very promising recovery to date, although he continued to be in the hospital. On January 30, 2008, a spokesperson for the family reported that Haydain Neale had continued to improve since the last official statement.

Following his recovery, Neale completed work on the album he had started to work on prior to the accident. On October 26, 2009, the band announced that the album, entitled SOULmate and to contain 10 new songs written before singer Neale's accident, would be released on December 1, 2009. All profits from the album go to the Haydain Neale Family Trust.

The first single, "Lonesome Highway", was made available on November 3, 2009.

On November 22, 2009, Haydain Neale died of lung cancer at Toronto's Mount Sinai Hospital.

In 2014, the band released a greatest hits compilation, which featured the previously unreleased songs "Got to Have It", "Whole Day" and "Spiralling". The song "Got to Have It" garnered a Juno Award nomination for R&B/Soul Recording of the Year at the Juno Awards of 2015.

Discography
Studio albums
Absolute (August 14, 1996)
Sleepless (April 4, 2000)
Resurrected (March 23, 2004)
mySoul (June 20, 2006)
Soulmate (December 1, 2009)

Singles
(Do You) Like It Like That
Eastbound
Unconditional
I Know What You Want
Can't Stop	
Somedays
Still Believe In Love
Shady Day
Lonesome Highway	
All You Need
Got To Have It

See also

Music of Canada
Canadian blues
List of bands from Canada

References

External links
jacksoul official website

Musical groups established in 1996
Musical groups disestablished in 2009
Musical groups from Toronto
Canadian contemporary R&B musical groups
Juno Award for R&B/Soul Recording of the Year winners
1996 establishments in Ontario
2009 disestablishments in Ontario
Canadian soul music groups